The 2007 East Carolina Pirates football team represented East Carolina University in the 2007 NCAA Division I FBS football season and played their home games in Dowdy–Ficklen Stadium. The team was coached by Skip Holtz, who was in his fourth year with the program.

The Pirates have a local television contract with WITN-TV, an NBC affiliate located in Washington, NC who elects to pick up games that are not picked up by national or regional networks, and all games are broadcast over the radio on the Pirate-ISP Sports Network. The flagship radio stations of the Pirates are Pirate Radio 1250 and 930 AM and Oldies 107.9 WNCT, both located in Greenville, NC. The games are called by the "Voice of the Pirates," Jeff Charles.

Preseason

Recruiting

Schedule

Roster

Coaching staff

Game summaries

Virginia Tech

Recap: Week 1 

The Pirates traveled to Blacksburg for an emotional game that marked the first football game since thirty-two students lost their lives in a shooting on the Virginia Tech campus. Prior to the game, the Hokies led the all-time series 8-4-1. The Pirates entered the game without starting quarterback Rob Kass and struggled offensively. After a costly interception returned for a touchdown by Macho Harris followed by a Sean Glennon touchdown pass, the Pirates were defeated by Virginia Tech, 17-7.

North Carolina

Recap: Week 2 

The Pirates welcomed the Tar Heels to Greenville for only the second time in this series' history. North Carolina went into the game leading the all-time record 8-1-1 after a 28-17 victory in Greenville in 2003, but they would be unable to repeat. Quarterback Patrick Pinkney led the Pirates offensively and completed 31 of 41 passes for 406 yards, but North Carolina's T. J. Yates would answer by throwing three touchdowns and keeping the game close. A costly mistake by the Tar Heels set up the final drive, where after missing all prior field goals in the game, Placekicker Ben Hartman made the game-winning field goal, leading the Pirates to defeat the Tar Heels in Greenville for the first time ever, 34-31.

Southern Miss

West Virginia

Houston

UCF

UTEP

NC State

UAB

Memphis

Marshall

Tulane

Hawaii Bowl

Postseason

NFL Draft Picks 
 Chris Johnson - Round 1: 24th (24th Overall) - Tennessee Titans

Awards

 Conference USA Special Teams Player of the Year: Chris Johnson

Honors

Statistics

Team

Scores by quarter

Offense

Rushing

Passing

Receiving

Defense

Special teams

References

East Carolina
East Carolina Pirates football seasons
Hawaii Bowl champion seasons
East Carolina Pirates football